The Lebanese French University LFU  Lebanese French University (LFU) is a private university. It was licensed in September 2007 by the Kurdistan Regional Government - Erbil (decree 2342).
It operates on its 50,000 square meter Erbil campus, 100 meter street, near Mosul road, Nasr Roundabout.

The university is also having a complex for student accommodation.
LFU offers undergraduate degrees in Law, Business Administration, Accounting and Finance, Computer Engineering, Computer Networking, Information Technology, English Language, French Language, Legal Administration, General Education, Marketing, Diplomacy, International Relations, and Fine Arts. It also offers postgraduate degrees in Business Administration, Accounting and Finance, and Information Technology.
LFU is an associate member of the Association of Arab Universities Union (AAU).

See also 

 Private Universities in Iraq

References

 Universities in Kurdistan Region (Iraq)
 Buildings and structures in Erbil
 International schools in Iraq
 French international schools in Asia
 Private universities and colleges
 Educational institutions established in 2007
2007 establishments in Iraqi Kurdistan